F. Scott Fitzgerald in Hollywood is a 1975 American TV movie about F. Scott Fitzgerald's screenwriting career.

It was directed by Anthony Page and written by James Costigan. It was mostly based on the memoirs of Sheilah Graham.

Plot
In 1937, F Scott Fitzgerald is trying to write scripts in Hollywood. He has a romance with Sheilah Graham and remembers his marriage to Zelda.

Cast
Jason Miller as F. Scott Fitzgerald
Tuesday Weld as Zelda Fitzgerald
Julia Foster as Sheilah Graham
Dolores Sutton as Dorothy Parker
Susanne Benton as The Starlet
Michael Lerner as Marvin Margulies
Tom Ligon as Alan Campbell
John Randolph as Rupert Wahler
Tom Rosqui as Edwin Knopf

Reception
The New York Times said the film "merely rehashed" the Fitzgerald story.

References

External links
F. Scott Fitzgerald in Hollywood at IMDb
F Scott Fitzgerald in Hollywood at BFI

1975 television films
1975 films
ABC network original films
American television films
Films directed by Anthony Page
Cultural depictions of F. Scott Fitzgerald